Jill Horan is an Irish camogie player, an All-Star winner and captain to the Tipperary team in 2011, when she was the player of the second and sixth rounds of the championship and a member of the Team of the Championship for 2011. With a total of 1-23 she was the seventh-highest-scoring player in the Senior Championship of 2011.

Other Awards
She helped Cashel win the 2009 Club Championship. She was an All-Star nominee in 2010.

References

External links
 Camogie.ie Official Camogie Association Website

Living people
Tipperary camogie players
Year of birth missing (living people)
UCC camogie players